Pitt Lake is the second-largest lake in the Lower Mainland of British Columbia. It is one of the world's relatively few tidal lakes, and among the largest. In Pitt Lake, there is on average a three-foot tide range; thus Pitt Lake is separated from sea level and tidal waters during most hours of each day during the 15 foot tide cycle of the Pitt River and Strait of Georgia estuary immediately downstream.

Geography
Pitt Lake is in a typical U-shaped glacial valley in the Pacific Ranges of the Coast Mountains. The overdeepening of the lower end of the valley over the span of the Wisconsin glaciation created a trough over 140 m below current sea level. After initial glacial retreat at around 13,000 years ago a saltwater fjord occupied this basin when relative sea levels were still ca 120 to 140m above current levels in the region. Unlike neighbouring Indian Arm and Howe Sound farther west, this fjord basin became partly cut off from tidal waters by sedimentation of the lower Fraser River ca 10,500 years ago, and Pitt Lake is now considered a tidal fjord lake.

The other fjord-lakes include Coquitlam Lake, Alouette Lake, Stave Lake, and Chehalis Lake.

The Pitt River drains into the northern end of Pitt Lake. The western shore of Pitt Lake are protected within Pinecone Burke Provincial Park, while most of the eastern shore are protected within Golden Ears Provincial Park. The southern end of Pitt Lake features an extensive marshland called Pitt Polder. While most of this marshland has since been drained for agricultural use, the northernmost portion is strictly protected in order to provide critical habitat for migratory birds.

Communities
The community of Pitt Meadows and the Katzie First Nations reserve of Pitt Lake Indian Reserve 4 are located at the southern end of the lake. Just southwest of the lake is the community of Port Coquitlam, which is across the Pitt River from Pitt Meadows. At the north end of the lake is a locality named Alvin, which is a transport and shipping point for logging companies and their employees.

Climate
Pitt Lake has an oceanic climate (Köppen climate type Cfb). As such, it features cool, rainy winters with relatively warm and dry summers.

Recreation
The lake is popular with boaters and canoeists, but is prone to heavy winds and rains as well as big waves (due to its great depth). The Upper Pitt, meaning the valley upstream from the lake, is considered one of BC's best fly-fishing rivers and one of its best steelhead streams.

In addition, there is a destination golfing resort in the Pitt Polder area called Swan-e-set.

Folklore

The area along the east side of the lake is somewhat notorious for being the reputed location of Slumach's lost gold mine, the location of many failed and sometimes disastrous searches for the alleged murderer's lost gold mine.  Local historian Bill Barlee has said "that this highly colourful and interesting tale, accepted as fact by a host of treasure seekers, probably does not exist."
According to Barlee by the geological information available it would appear unlikely that a gold deposit would be found in the region of Pitt Lake.  Historian Garnet Basque states that geologists are convinced that the region around Pitt Lake is not gold bearing.
The lost mine of Pitt Lake is a story without scientific support.

References

Lakes of the Lower Mainland
History of British Columbia
New Westminster Land District